Mártires de Barbados Stadium is a multi-use stadium in Bayamo, Cuba.  It is currently used mostly for baseball games and is the home stadium of Granma Alazanes.  The stadium holds 10,000 people.

Baseball venues in Cuba
Bayamo
Buildings and structures in Granma Province